Kaupichthys is a genus of eels of the family Chlopsidae.

Etymology
The genus is named in honor of German naturalist Johann Jacob Kaup (1803–1873), as a recognition for his work on apodal fishes.

Species
The currently recognized species in this genus are:
 Kaupichthys atronasus L. P. Schultz, 1953 (black-nostril false moray)
 Kaupichthys brachychirus L. P. Schultz, 1953 (shortfin false moray)
 Kaupichthys diodontus L. P. Schultz, 1943 (common false moray)
 Kaupichthys hyoproroides (Strömman, 1896) (false moray)
 Kaupichthys japonicus Matsubara & Asano, 1960
 Kaupichthys nuchalis J. E. Böhlke, 1967 (collared eel)

References

Chlopsidae
Taxa named by Leonard Peter Schultz